"Dancing Days" is a song by English rock band Led Zeppelin.  It appears on their 1973 album, Houses of the Holy, and was released as a single in the US.  It was recorded at Stargroves, England in 1972.  It was inspired by an Indian tune that Jimmy Page and Robert Plant heard while traveling in Bombay.  This was the first track from the album to be offered for radio play by Atlantic Records. It was premiered on 24 March 1973 on the BBC Radio One Rosko lunch time show.

Live performances
As with the single's A-side, "Over the Hills and Far Away", "Dancing Days" was introduced by the band in concert well ahead of its commercial release. The earliest live documented reference is in Seattle on 19 June 1972 where the song was performed twice: once during the main set and again as an encore; it was then performed frequently during the rest of this tour, with a version appearing on the live album, How the West Was Won. With the release of Houses of the Holy, however, "Dancing Days" was largely dropped from concerts, although an abridged, acoustic version was occasionally performed during the 1977 U.S. tour. A full electric version was played as an encore on 13 July 1973 at Cobo Hall, Detroit, Michigan as featured on the "Monsters of Rock" bootleg.

Reception
In a contemporary review for Houses of the Holy, Gordon Fletcher of Rolling Stone gave "Dancing Days" a negative review, calling the track nothing but a piece of "filler".

See also
List of cover versions of Led Zeppelin songs"Dancing Days" entries

References

Led Zeppelin songs
Songs written by Jimmy Page
Songs written by Robert Plant
1973 singles
Song recordings produced by Jimmy Page
Stone Temple Pilots songs
Atlantic Records singles
1973 songs
Songs about dancing